R. Kalidas was a politician in Tamil Nadu, India. He was State vice-president of the Hindu Makkal Katchi.

Death
R. Kalidas was murdered in Madurai on June 21, 2005. According to police sources he was hacked to death by two men in broad daylight. He was 55 years old. Police sources indicated that they suspected 'fundamentalists' as the culprits of the murder.

References

2005 deaths
Deaths by blade weapons
Year of birth missing